Kang Haeng-suk is a retired female badminton player from South Korea.

Career
She won the bronze medal at the 1985 IBF World Championships in women's doubles with Hwang Sun-ae.

References

IBF World Championships

South Korean female badminton players
1961 births
Living people
Asian Games medalists in badminton
Badminton players at the 1982 Asian Games
Badminton players at the 1986 Asian Games
Asian Games gold medalists for South Korea
Asian Games bronze medalists for South Korea
Medalists at the 1982 Asian Games
Medalists at the 1986 Asian Games
20th-century South Korean women
21st-century South Korean women